The Chrysler Phaeton was a four-door convertible sedan concept car built by Chrysler in 1997.

Background 
The Phaeton was inspired by Chrysler's historic Newport Phaeton, and the Imperial Parade Phaeton. It had a 48-valve 5.4 L aluminum V12 rated at 425 hp. The suspension was a modified double wishbone with independent double A-arms. Another unique feature of the car was that it had gauges in the rear seats. 

John E. Herlitz, Chrysler Corporation's Vice President of Product Design, said, "Phaeton embraces and contemporizes elegant, classic design cues from historic touring automobiles of the 1930s, 40s and 50s."

The imposing dual cowl four-door hard-top convertible was inspired by Chrysler's dual cowl 1940 Newport parade car, a vehicle used primarily for transporting dignitaries and members of elite families during that time period. "With Phaeton, we expanded the use of today's convertible by giving it four doors and two windshields," said K. Neil Walling, Chrysler Corporation's Design Director. "We took an elegant design execution that was originally intended for the wealthy and created a practical, contemporary convertible."

The dual cowl has expressive flowing lines, finely drawn details in the egg-crate grille, and a retractable rear compartment windshield. "Chrysler Phaeton effectively captures classic images from the Chrysler LHX and Chrysler Atlantic and translates them into a convertible format," said Walling.

Richness, comfort and attention-to-detail are communicated throughout the vehicle's interior which features cream and brown-colored leather trim, woven cream leather inserts, satin metal details, and Zebrano wood accents. Both front and rear passenger compartments are separate and have their own radio, climate controls, luxurious seats, arm rests and center consoles. Speedometer and tachometer gauges are also featured in both compartments which allow rear passengers to monitor vehicle performance at a glance.

The power retractable convertible hardtop was developed and built by ASC, which made convertible tops for Chrysler (until the 2007 Sebring) and was also responsible for much of the design of the Chevrolet  SSR.

Specifications 
Phaeton's 132-inch (3353 mm) wheelbase and 22-inch wheels are powered by a 48-valve 5.4 liter aluminum V12 engine. Ride and handling are enhanced by an advanced suspension, similar to that of the Dodge Viper. The body-on-frame, rear wheel drive car used a four-speed automatic with a Dana 40 axle.

"We wanted Phaeton's performance characteristics to be comparable to that of its inspirational father, the Newport," said Walling. "After all, the Newport was the pace car of the Indianapolis 500 in 1941."

Measurements are in inches/millimeters, unless otherwise specified.	
Length:	215.0/5461
Width:	78.0/1981
Height:	55.0/1397
Wheelbase:	132.0/3353
Front Track:	63.0/1600
Rear Track:	61.5/1562
Wheels:	Cast Aluminum
Front	8 x 22
Rear	8 x 22
Tires:	Goodyear
Front	P245/55R22
Rear	P245/55R22
Engine:	5.4 Liter V-12
425 hp (313 kW) (ACT)
Suspension:	 
Front	Modified Double Wishbone
Rear	Independent Double "A" Arm
Brakes	ABS, four-wheel disc
Transmission:	Four-speed automatic
Drivetrain:	Rear wheel drive
Dana 40 rear axle

Failure in production and representation in gaming 
Plans for the Phaeton never matriculated, and it (nor any huge car like it) never reached production as of 2020.

The car was also included as a selection in the PlayStation video game Gran Turismo 2 as a special vehicle that could only be won.

References

Phaeton